MEL Magazine is a men's magazine headquartered in Marina del Rey, California. Originally funded by Dollar Shave Club,  Mel has been described by New York Times journalist Amanda Hess as "the rare men's magazine that has taken upon itself to investigate masculinity, not enforce it." The magazine has no advertisements.

MEL Magazine was started in 2015 as a newsletter with 5 to 7 employees. It was originally published on the third-party site Medium. In 2018, MEL reworked the site and transitioned from Medium to a stand-alone website. In 2017 MEL had approximately 1.4 million monthly unique visitors, which grew to 2.8 million by July 2018. In 2020, traffic grew 30 percent, due in part to the COVID-19 pandemic, reaching 4 million unique monthly visitors, however, on March 24, 2021, MEL ceased publishing and all staff were laid off.  

On July 7, 2021, it was announced that MEL had been acquired by Recurrent Ventures and would be relaunching under longtime editor in chief Josh Schollmeyer. 

On July 22, 2022, MEL staff were laid off again.

References

External links
 

2015 establishments in the United States
Men's magazines published in the United States
Monthly magazines published in the United States
Magazines established in 2015
Magazines published in California
Modern liberal magazines published in the United States